This is a list of awards and nominations received by New Zealand director, screenwriter and producer Jane Campion.

Active in the cinematographic field since the 1980s, Campion wrote her short film promo, Peel, in 1984, which was recognised at the Cannes Film Festival with the Short Film Palme d'Or. She then directed her first film Sweetie (1989), gaining support from Australian critics who awarded her the AACTA Awards for Best Screenplay and with the Byron Kennedy Award for her contribution to the renewal of the Australian film industry.

In 1990 she presented her full-length film An Angel at My Table at the Venice Film Festival, being honoured with five awards, including the Grand Jury Prize. In 1993, she wrote, directed and produced the internationally critically acclaimed film The Piano, which earned Campion the Academy Award for Best Original Screenplay and made her the second woman in Academy Awards history to be nominated for Best Director. Thanks to the film also became the first female filmmaker to receive the Palme d'Or at the Cannes Film Festival.

After producing and directing Bright Star, which was nominated for two Satellite Awards, Campion directed and produced the television series Top of the Lake, earning three Primetime Emmy Awards nominations in 2013.

In 2021, Campion wrote, directed and produced the film The Power of the Dog. It became one of the most critically acclaimed films of that year for its direction, screenplay and ensemble cast, winning the Golden Globe Award for Best Motion Picture – Drama and Best Director, leading the 94th Academy Awards nominations, becoming the first woman to receive multiple Best Director nominations. Campion also won the Academy Award for Best Director, becoming the third female director to win it in the history of the awards ceremony.

Major associations

Academy Awards
The Academy Awards, popularly known as the Oscars, are awards for artistic and technical merit in the film industry, given annually by the Academy of Motion Picture Arts and Sciences.

BAFTA Awards 
The BAFTA Awards are presented in an annual award show hosted by the British Academy of Film and Television Arts to honour the best British and international contributions to film, TV shows and video-games.

Golden Globe Awards
The Golden Globe Awards are accolades bestowed by the members of the Hollywood Foreign Press Association, recognizing excellence in both American and international film and television.

Primetime Emmy Awards
The Primetime Emmy Awards are bestowed by the Academy of Television Arts & Sciences (ATAS) in recognition of excellence in American primetime television programming-

Other awards and nominations

AACTA Awards
The Australian Academy of Cinema and Television Arts Awards, called Australian Film Institute Awards or AFI Awards from 1985 to 2010, are presented annually by the Australian Academy of Cinema and Television Arts (AACTA).

Art Directors Guild Awards

The Arts Foundation Te Tumu Toi
In December 2022 Campion was a recipient of the New Zealand Arts Icon Award Whakamana Hiranga, which makes her one of twenty current living cultural icons.

British Independent Film Awards
The British Independent Film Awards (BIFA Awards) is an organisation that celebrates, supports and promotes British independent cinema and filmmaking talent in United Kingdom, Australia and New Zealand.

British Screenwriters' Awards

Broadcasting Press Guild Awards
The Broadcasting Press Guild (BPG) is a British association of journalists dedicated to the topic of general media issues.

Cannes Film Festival
The Cannes Film Festival, is an annual film festival held in Cannes, France, which previews new films of all genres, including documentaries, from all around the world.

César Awards
The César Awards is the national film award of France, bestowed by the Académie des Arts et Techniques du Cinéma.

Critics' Choice Awards
The Critics' Choice Movie Awards or Broadcast Film Critics Association Award is an awards show presented annually by the American-Canadian Critics Choice Association (CCA) to honor the finest in cinematic achievement.

Directors Guild of America Awards
The Directors Guild of America Awards are issued annually by the Directors Guild of America.

Gold Derby Film Awards
The Gold Derby Film Awards are issued annually by Gold Derby to recognized the best in film industry.

Independent Spirit Awards 
The Independent Spirit Awards are awards dedicated to excellence in the independent film industry, produced by Film Independent, a not-for-profit arts organization that used to produce the LA Film Festival.

Producers Guild of America Awards
The Producers Guild of America Awards are issued annually by the Producers Guild of America.

Satellite Awards
The Satellite Awards are annual awards given by the International Press Academy that are commonly noted in entertainment industry journals.

Venice Film Festival
The Venice Film Festival is part of the Venice Biennale and is the world's oldest film festival.

Writers Guild of America Awards
The Writers Guild of America Awards are issued annually by the Writers Guild of America.

Critics awards

Awards received by Campion's movies

Directed Academy Award performances

References

External links
 

Lists of awards received by film director